Sasthibrata Chakravarti (1939–2015),  known as Sasthi Brata, was a British-Indian Indo-Anglian writer of fiction. He is best known for his best selling novel Confessions of an Indian Woman Eater.

Early life and education

Sasthibrata was educated at Calcutta Boys' School, Kolkata and then at Presidency College, Kolkata, where read Physics.

Post literary career
Sasthibrata lived a checkered life. After his literary career, he had worked as a salesman for air conditioners, a lavatory attendant, a postman, a kitchen porter, to supplement his pension. He died in 2015 at the age of 75.

Works

Novels 
1971. Confessions of an Indian Woman Eater
1973. She and He
1980. The Sensuous Guru: The Making of a Mystic President

Short Stories
1978. Encounter

Poetry
1960. Eleven Poems

Memoir and Autobiography
1968. My God Died Young 
1975. A Search for Home 
1976. Traitor to India: A Search for Home

Travel
1985 Labyrinths in the Lotus Land
1986 India: The Perpetual Paradox

References

British people of Bengali descent
Indian emigrants to England
Bengali writers
Indian male novelists
Writers from Kolkata
Presidency University, Kolkata alumni
University of Calcutta alumni
1939 births
2015 deaths
20th-century Indian novelists
Novelists from West Bengal
20th-century Indian male writers